The Fort Myers Beach School (also known as the Fort Myers Beach Elementary School or simply Beach School) is a historic school in Fort Myers Beach, Florida. It is located at 2751 Oak Street. On July 8, 1999, it was added to the U.S. National Register of Historic Places.

This property is part of the Lee County Multiple Property Submission, a Multiple Property Submission to the National Register.

On September 28, 2022 the school was largely destroyed by Hurricane Ian, though the district has expressed interest in trying to save at least part of the structure.

References

 Lee County listings at National Register of Historic Places
 Florida's Office of Cultural and Historical Programs
 Lee County listings
 Fort Myers Beach Elementary School

External links

 Fort Myers Beach Elementary School - official site

Public elementary schools in Florida
National Register of Historic Places in Lee County, Florida
Schools in Lee County, Florida